Henry Whitfield may refer to:

 Henry Whitfield (cricketer) (1903–1937), Australian cricketer
 Henry Whitfield (lawyer) (1619–1688), Irish politician
 Henry L. Whitfield (1868–1927), Governor of Mississippi
 Henry Wase Whitfield (1814–1877), commander of British troops in China
 Henry Whitfield (minister), a founder of Guilford, Connecticut
 Henry Whitfield House
 Henry D. Whitfield, brother-in-law of Andrew Carnegie and architectural partner in Whitfield & King